Ms. G.O.A.T., an acronym for "Greatest Of All Time", is the debut mixtape by American rapper Lil' Kim. It was officially released on June 3, 2008 and was produced by Mister Cee and DJ Whoo Kid, DJs from New York City. The title references the 2000 album G.O.A.T. by American rapper LL Cool J.

Background
After claiming the desire to possess creative control and a subsequent departure from her previous major record label, Atlantic, Lil Kim began working on Ms. G.O.A.T. in October 2006. This also marked her first musical endeavor since her incarceration, and she was released in July 2006.

Lil Kim had never made a mixtape before, and in an MTV interview, she stated "I always wanted to do a mixtape... I used to see how 50 (Cent) used to do it so hard... Damn, it's not a lot of girls doing it." Ms. G.O.A.T. was her first independent release. Prior to the album's release, "Chillin' Tonight" received airplay on the radio. The album showcased new songs from Lil Kim, as well as several remixes she was working on. There are skits intermittently, and the album features collaborations with 50 Cent, Maino, a Brooklyn based rapper and Britney Spears, as well as several other Hip Hop stars. Lil' Kim also retaliates to Remy Ma on the track "I Get It", as part of a continuation of rivalry, and she pays homage to her heroes Lauryn Hill and MC Lyte through samples or thematics of "Mis-Education of Lil' Kim", which features the beat of "Lost Ones", a song off of The Miseducation of Lauryn Hill, and "Hood News", respectively.

Lil' Kim performed the song "Chillin' Tonight" on a 2007 comedy-drama, The Game, in the episode Media Blitz, which she also starred in as herself. As part of promotion, Lil' Kim offered signed copies of Ms. G.O.A.T. in a contest, where fans would submit requests on who they would like to see her work with, as well as why she is the "Greatest of All Time".

Reviews
Among critics, the mixtape has received generally positive reviews. It has been called a representation of Lil' Kim's return to the streets. Tito Salinas of All Hip Hop says "Lil' Kim shows that her time behind bars didn't rust all of her swag away" on Ms. G.O.A.T. On the other hand, Ehren Gresehover of New York Mag says that although one of the tracks "The Miseducation of Lil' Kim" is not bad, he wished that it was Lauryn Hill who was making a comeback instead.

Track listing

References

Sources

.

Lil' Kim albums
2008 mixtape albums